Rake in Grass is a three-person independent video game developer based in the Czech Republic. It was founded in 2000.  The studio makes computer, mobile, and console games. It was nominated for an award in artistic contribution to Czech video game output in 2012.

Games 
Troll (2003)
Jets'n'Guns (2004)
Undercroft (2006)
Styrateg (2006)
Fireman's Adventures (2006)
King Mania (2007)
Larva Mortus (2008)
Archibald's Adventures (2008)
Archmage (2008)
Be a King: Lost Lands (2009)
Crystal Cave Classic (2009)
Westbang (2009)
Be a King 2 (2010)
Northmark: Hour of the Wolf (2012)
Loot Hunter (2014)
Rampage Knights (2015)
Jets'n'Guns 2 (2020)
Silent Sector (2021)

References

External links 
Studio in Czech computer game database

Video game companies of the Czech Republic
Video game companies established in 2000
Czech companies established in 2000